Irina Meszynski (born 24 March 1962 in Berlin) is a retired East German discus thrower.
 
On 17 August 1984 Meszynski set a world record in women's discus throw at boycott inspired Friendship Games of 73.36 meters.  Her record lasted barely a week before it was bested by Zdeňka Šilhavá with a mark that puts Šilhavá as equal to the number 2 thrower in history.  Today, Meszynski's result is enough to occupy the sixth place on the world all-time list and a fourth place on the German all-time list behind Gabriele Reinsch, Ilke Wyludda and Diana Gansky-Sachse.

Her career highlights include a gold medal with 60.30 m at the 1979 European Junior Championships, an eighth place with 63.78 m at the 1982 European Championships in Athletics and a fourth place with 65.20 m at the 1986 European Championships in Athletics. She represented the sports team TSC Berlin and became East German champion in 1982.

She weighed 97 kg, and stood 1.76 m tall.

References

1962 births
Living people
East German female discus throwers
World record setters in athletics (track and field)
Athletes from Berlin
Friendship Games medalists in athletics